The Robert family of Liberia is a prominent elite Americo-Liberian family of African American descent originating from Petersburg and Norfolk, Virginia based in Liberia with descendants in United States, United Kingdom, and Sierra Leone. The family produced several distinguished Liberian engineers, doctors, merchants, lawyers, diplomats, and politicians including Joseph Jenkins Roberts, the first non-white governor of the Colony of Liberia and the first and seventh president of the Republic of Liberia.

Roberts family of Petersburg, Virginia
The Roberts family of Liberia originated in Norfolk, Virginia and expanded into Petersburg, Virginia in the 1810s.

Family Achievements
The Roberts family produced several politicians and businessman such as President Joseph Jenkins Roberts, who served as the first black American Governor of the Colony of Liberia and the first President of the Republic of Liberia.

Descendants
Several prominent Liberian families descend from the Roberts family of Liberia including the Richards and Davis families.

 
Americo-Liberian people
People of Americo-Liberian descent
Americo-Liberian families
People from Monrovia